The 1994–95 season was the 76th in the history of AS Saint-Étienne and their ninth consecutive season in the top flight. The club participated in the French Division 1, the Coupe de France, and the inaugural Coupe de la Ligue.

Despite finishing in 18th place, Saint-Étienne was spared from relegation, following the OM-VA affair which prevented Marseille from being promoted to Division 1.

Players

Transfers

In

Out

Pre-season and friendlies

Competitions

Overall record

French Division 1

League table

Results summary

Results by round

Matches

Coupe de France

Coupe de la Ligue

References

AS Saint-Étienne seasons
Saint-Étienne